LAC Colombia (Líneas Aéreas del Caribe) was a Colombian airline that was founded in Barranquilla in 1974.

History
By an initiative of Captain Luís Carlos Donado Velilla, who wanted to withdraw from Aerocosta and set up a new airline only from his family, he was born on February 28, 1974. LAC started as a limited company and Luis's  first partners were, his wife María Fajardo de Donado and his two brothers Orlando and Raúl Donado Velilla. Captain Lucho Donado already had experience in the creation and development of airlines, as he had co-founded LATCO, Aerocóndor and Aerocosta. Barranquilla companies in history were good at achieving positioning and leadership in the air passenger and cargo market. The time to start a company alone was very hard to do however given the conditions of focusing almost all your time on the business.

In 1972, and despite being Aerocosta at its best, Captain Luis Carlos Donado (one of the majority shareholders) was tired of non-family members and decided to sell this airline to Floramerica. The new managers of this company did not like the C-46 much and that is how Lucho Donado made a proposal to buy them for a price slightly higher than what they had acquired, but with the condition that they let them operate under the banner of Aerocosta until LAC had the approval of the Aerocivil. This was the case and the Donado Velilla brothers flew their two Curtiss planes through the Eastern Plains with the Aerocosta flag, but billing the flights as Donado Velilla Brothers (DOVEL) until February 28, 1974, when they already start operating with the Colombian Aerocivil as Caribbean Airlines.

The company was born with two Curtiss C-46s which were painted purple and the Barranquilleros nicknamed them "The Bishops." These planes covered national routes between the Atlantic Coast, the Eastern Plains and the Capital of the Republic. In mid-September of the same year 74, the company became closed anonymous and the wives and children of the Donado Velilla brothers were included as partners. Raúl Donado Velilla moved to Bogotá with his family and Carlos Alberto Donado Fajardo (finishing his university studies) is linked to the company in Barranquilla. In August 1974, the company acquired a Douglas DC-6 in Damascus (Syria) and began international operations to Panama, Margarita Island and some Caribbean Islands. In the middle of that year, LAC signed an important agreement with the KLM by means of which Colombian flowers were transported from Bogotá to Curaçao where they made connections to Amsterdam. At that time the leading freight agencies in the market were Colcarga (today UTI) and Florcarga (today DHL Danzas).

Routes

LAC signed an important contract with El Tiempo and El Espectador to transport the press every night from Bogotá to Barranquilla, Cali and Medellín. In August 1977, LAC sold the Curtiss and renewed its fleet by acquiring four DC-6s in auction in Tucson (Arizona) of which two were operated (HK-1702 and HK-1703) and the rest were scrapped for spare parts. With these two new Douglas DC-6B, the newly approved route to Miami began operating in October with three new weekly frequencies, weekly flights to Panama are increased to three, and the new route to Caracas is opened. 
In March 1978 the fifth DC-6B arrives and the company restructures its flying routes:
Three weekly frequencies on the Bogota-Barranquilla-Miami route
Three weekly frequencies to Caracas
Four weekly frequencies to Panama
Three weekly frequencies to Curaçao
A weekly flight to Pointe-a-Pitre
Six weekly flights Bogota-Cartagena-Barranquilla-Bogota
Six weekly flights Bogota-Medellin-Bogota

Fleet
LAC Colombia consisted of the following fleet:

Accidents and incidents
On February 4, 1976, a Douglas DC-6B (registered HK-1389) crashed into the sea following engine trouble while flying from Santa Marta, Colombia to Curaçao. All three crew members on board were killed.
On April 29, 1978, a Douglas DC-6B (registered HK-1705) crashed shortly after takeoff from El Dorado International Airport. All three crew members and five of the nine passengers were killed. The aircraft reportedly failed to gain sufficient height on takeoff from runway 30, as it struck a tree and broke up.
On October 15, 1992, a Douglas DC-8-55F (registered HK-3753X) lost its directional control on landing at Olaya Herrera Airport. It veered off the left side of the runway and subsequently, the nose landing gear collapsed. All three crew members on board survived.
On February 4, 1996, Flight 028, a Douglas DC-8-55CF (registered HK-3979), flying to São Paulo, Brazil lost lift, speed, and fell on a neighborhood in Asunción, Paraguay due to the negligence and recklessness of its crew, causing the death of the four crew members on board, as well as 18 people on the ground. This accident practically caused the airline's liquidation a few months later. It became the worst air tragedy in Paraguay.

See also
List of defunct airlines of Colombia

References

External links

Defunct airlines of Colombia
Airlines established in 1974
Airlines disestablished in 1996
Defunct companies of Colombia